"Pour toi Arménie" (English translation: "For You, Armenia") is a 1989 song written and composed by Charles Aznavour, and recorded by a group of French singers (and also a few actors and TV presenters) who were popular at the time. This charity single was intended to raise funds to help the Armenians who experienced the 1988 Spitak earthquake. It sold more than 1 million copies under the Trema-EMI label.

Background and writing
This song was entirely written and composed by Charles Aznavour and Georges Garvarentz which made a great tribute to the country of his ancestral origins and his relationship that he always have kept in his heart. After the earthquake in Armenia, he asked his singers, actors and TV presenters friends to sing with him "Pour toi Arménie", song devoted to help victims of this tragedy. At the same time, in the United Kingdom, the collective band named Rock Aid Armenia made a cover of "Smoke on the Water" also for the same charitable purpose.

Vocalists
The artists that composed this group were :

Adamo 
Serge Avedikian 
Marcel Amont 
Animo 
Rosy Armen 
Charles Aznavour 
Katia Aznavour 
Didier Barbelivien 
Phil Barney 
Gilbert Bécaud 
Jane Birkin
Gérard Blanc
Richard Bohringer
Zani Boni
Carlos
Jean Carmet
Jean-Pierre Cassel
Alain Chamfort
Frédéric Château
Louis Chedid
Julien Clerc
Nicole Croisille
Dallas
David et Jonathan
Michel Delpech
Sacha Distel
Dorothée
Michel Drucker
Yves Duteil
Elsa 

Jean-Pierre Foucault
Roland Giraud
Richard Gotainer
Félix Gray
Serge Guirao
Johnny Hallyday
Robert Hossein
Images 
Jairo
Véronique Jannot
Patricia Kaas
Kimera 
David Koven
Gilles Lacoste
Jean-Luc Lahaye
Francis Lalanne
Serge Lama
Philippe Lavil
Herbert Léonard 
Lio
Marie Myriam
Didier Marouani
Mireille Mathieu
Fred Mella 
Macha Meryl
Eddy Mitchell
Pierre Mondy
Gilbert Montagné
Eric Morena
Nana Mouskouri

Georges Moustaki
Thierry Mutin
Nacash
Nicoletta
Florent Pagny
Vanessa Paradis
Popeck
Jackie Quartz
Rachid 
Serge Reggiani
Renaud
Line Renaud
Pierre Richard
Dick Rivers
Patrick Sabatier
Henri Salvador
Michel Sardou
Shushana
Alain Souchon
Linda de Suza
Jean-Marc Thibault
François Valéry
Rosy Varte
Hervé Vilard
Marina Vlady
Laurent Voulzy
Jacques Weber

All the names feature on the single's cover.

Track listings
 7" single
 "Pour toi Arménie" – 4:05
 "Ils sont tombés" – 4:06

The vinyl version of "Ils sont tombés" is recitated, unlike other versions.

Chart performances
In France, "Pour toi Arménie" had an immediate huge success: it went straight to number one on the French SNEP Singles Chart edition of 11 February 1989 and remained atop for ten weeks, then dropped and left the chart after 18 weeks of presence. The same year, the single was certified Platinum disc by the French certifier, the Syndicat National de l'Édition Phonographique. It featured for a long time in the Guinness Book of Records as it was the first single to enter the French Singles Chart at number one. It was also the first appearance of Charles Aznavour on the French top 50. In addition, "Pour toi Arménie" was a top three hit in Belgium (Wallonia), and debuted at a peak of number four on the European Hot 100 Singles, and remained on the chart for 17 weeks.

Italian version
An Italian version of the song, with the Aznavour's lyrics adapted in Italian by Andrea Lo Vecchio, was recorded with the title "Per te Armenia" in the Fonit Cetra studios. Together with the same Aznavour, involved artists included Fabrizio De André, Gino Paoli, Gigliola Cinquetti, Mia Martini, Milva, Iva Zanicchi, Sergio Endrigo, Dori Ghezzi, Eugenio Finardi, Enzo Jannacci, Pierangelo Bertoli, Sabrina Salerno, Mietta, Orietta Berti, I Camaleonti, Mino Reitano, Nilla Pizzi, Gazebo, Tullio De Piscopo, Gianni Bella, Franco Simone, Scialpi, Dario Baldan Bembo, Antonella Ruggiero, Lara Saint Paul, Tony Dallara, Ricky Gianco, Mario Castelnuovo, Alberto Radius, Pino D'Angiò, Christian, Memo Remigi, Gianfranco Manfredi, Francesco Baccini, Cristiano Malgioglio, Stefano Rosso, Mimmo Cavallo, Gilda Giuliani, Vivien Vee, Gepy & Gepy, Massimo Boldi, Alessandra Mussolini, Lorella Cuccarini. The B-side of the single was a narrated version of the lyrics, performed by Vittorio Gassman.

Charts and certifications

Weekly charts

Year-end charts

Certifications

References

Songs about Asia
1989 singles
All-star recordings
Charity singles
Charles Aznavour songs
SNEP Top Singles number-one singles
Songs written by Charles Aznavour
Songs with music by Georges Garvarentz
1989 songs